John Ongman (November 15, 1844 – February 28, 1931) was a Swedish Baptist pastor and founder of the Örebro Missionary Society and Örebro Missionary School. He also was the first pastor of the First Swedish Baptist Church in Saint Paul, Minnesota and also a pastor of the First Swedish Baptist Church in Chicago. He was an energetic evangelist and influential leader of the Swedish Baptists both in America and Sweden.

Upbringing 
He was the fourth of six siblings and grew up in a Christian home. His father, Nils Sköld, was a soldier by profession and his mother, Maria Laurentia Sten, came from a blacksmith family with roots in Norway. Ongman went to school for four years and at the age of 17 he traditionally enlisted as a soldier in the Jämtland Ranger Corps to follow in his father's footsteps. It was in the military that he was given the name Ångman (possibly because at the age of 18 he lived in Ångmon/Ångron), which was later rewritten in English as Ongman.

Conversion and work 
In 1864, he visited his friend Karl Hansson, who was newly saved, and Ongman also accepted salvation at the age of eighteen. He was baptized in Myssjö Baptist Church in Kövra, Sweden, on March 4 (or March 1) in an opening in frozen Lake Storsjön and soon began to preach. In 1866 he began full-time preaching and traveling, and on May 14, 1868, he traveled to the United States for the first time. He first worked as pastor in Red Wing, Minnesota as well as for the American Baptist Home Mission Society.

In 1873 he was called as a pastor to Saint Paul, Minnesota, where he founded the first Swedish-speaking Baptist congregation in the city that same year. He moved to Chicago in 1873 and became pastor of another Swedish Baptist church while studying at the Swedish branch of the Baptist Union Theological Seminary for a few years. In 1881 he moved back to Saint Paul, Minnesota, where he lived (with the exception of 1885–1886) until he moved back to Sweden.

During the 1890s Ongman had been active as a Bible school teacher and founder of the Örebro Missionary Society (1892). In 1908 he founded the Örebro Missionary School for the training of domestic preachers and missionaries.

Ongman was succeeded after his death in 1931 by the editor of Missionsbaneret, Pastor .

Personal life 
Ongman was married three times. His first wife was Christina Andersdotter, who died in 1871. He married his second wife, Vilhelmine (Mimmi) Eriksson, in 1872; she died in 1892. Ongman married for a third time in 1894 to Johanna (Hanna) Holmgren. According to those close to him, he was a true man of prayer who was not particularly theoretically or intellectually inclined, but who won people's respect through the love and care he showed. He was said to be passionate about missions work and often went his own way in order to, according to him, stand firm in and be faithful to God's call.

John Ongman is buried in Nikolai cemetery in Örebro.

Bibliography
  Örebro 1890.
 . Örebro 1891.
 . Örebro 1892.
 . Örebro 1893.
 . Örebro 1896.
 . Askersund 1896.
 . Örebro 1899.
 . Örebro 1900.
 . Uppsala 1901.
 . Örebro 1903.
 . Örebro 1906.
 ? Örebro 1908.
 . Örebro 1909.
 . Örebro 1910.
 . Örebro 1911.
 . Örebro 1911.
 . Örebro 1913.
 . Örebro 1915.
 . Örebro 1916.
 . Örebro 1917.
 . Örebro 1920.
 . Örebro 1921.
 . Örebro 1921.
 . Örebro 1924.
 ? Örebro 1926.
 . Örebro 1928.
 . Örebro 1929.
 . Örebro 1931–1934.

References

 John Magnusson: John Ongman, en levnadsteckning. Örebro Missionsförenings Förlag, Örebro 1932.
 Ongman-minnen: personliga minnen från pastor John Ongmans liv och verksamhet av ett 25-tal författare. Örebro Missionsförenings förlag 1939.
 Eric Wärenstam: En trons hövding. Örebro 1945.

1844 births
1931 deaths
People from Berg Municipality
Swedish Baptist ministers
Swedish Christian hymnwriters